Ephestia disparella is a species of snout moth in the genus Ephestia. It was described by George Hampson in 1901. It is found in southern Europe.

References

Phycitini
Moths described in 1901
Moths of Europe
Moths of Asia